Divya Saxena (born 16 September 1993) is a Canadian cricketer. She plays for the national women's cricket team as an all-rounder and has also previously played for the Kenya women's cricket team. She is currently the vice-captain of the Canadian team.

International career

Kenya
Saxena began her international career with the Kenya team. The following day, she played her second and final match for Kenya against Uganda at the Premier Club Ground, Nairobi. Both matches were played in a 50over format.

Canada
On 7 October 2021, Saxena was named vice-captain of the Canada team squad selected for the 2021 ICC Women's T20 World Cup Americas Qualifier, to be played later that month at the Reforma Athletic Club in Naucalpan, Mexico. She made her WT20I debut for Canada on 18 October 2021, against Argentina. She opened the batting, top scored for the match with 70*, and was awarded player of the match, which Canada won by 72 runs.

Three days later, on 22 October 2021, in Canada's second match against Argentina, Saxena again opened the batting, and top scored for the match with 39*. Once again, Canada won the match, by 9 wickets, and again, Saxena was player of the match.

On 24 October 2021, against the United States, Saxena opened the batting and top scored for the match with 40 runs to guide Canada to victory by seven runs. However, she also generated substantial controversy worldwide by allegedly obstructing the field in preventing the United States fielders from catching a ball she had edged into the air while still yet to score. To the surprise of many, she was given "not out" by the umpire. At the end of the tournament, she was also named MVP for scoring 180 runs in six innings and being not out in three of them. Canada nevertheless finished only third; the United States was the winner.

References 

1993 births
Living people
Canada women Twenty20 International cricketers
Canadian women cricketers
Kenyan emigrants to Canada
Kenyan women cricketers